Obornjača is a village in Serbia. It is situated in the Ada municipality, in the North Banat District, Vojvodina province. The village has a Hungarian ethnic majority (93.31%) and it has a population of 389 people (2002 census).

See also
List of places in Serbia
List of cities, towns and villages in Vojvodina

External links
Obornjača

Places in Bačka
Populated places in North Banat District
Ada, Serbia
Hungarian communities in Serbia